Spyros Spyrou is a Cypriot Olympic middle-distance runner. He represented his country in the men's 1500 meters and the men's 800 meters at the 1988 Summer Olympics. His time was a 1:49.84 in the 800, and a 3:42.32/3:43.49 in the 1500 heats/semifinals.

References 

1958 births
Living people
Cypriot male middle-distance runners
Olympic athletes of Cyprus
Athletes (track and field) at the 1988 Summer Olympics
Commonwealth Games competitors for Cyprus
Athletes (track and field) at the 1982 Commonwealth Games